James Mosgrove (June 14, 1821 – November 27, 1900) was a Greenback member of the U.S. House of Representatives from Pennsylvania.

James Mosgrove was born in Kittanning, Pennsylvania.  He attended the common schools and was engaged in the iron business.

He was an unsuccessful candidate in 1878 on the Greenback ticket.  However, Mosgrove was elected as a Greenback candidate to the Forty-seventh Congress.  He declined to be a candidate for renomination in 1882.  He also declined to be a candidate for the Democratic nomination for Governor.  He was engaged in banking and was president of the First National Bank from 1882 until his death in Kittanning in 1900.  Interment in Kittanning Cemetery.

Sources

The Political Graveyard

1821 births
1900 deaths
People from Armstrong County, Pennsylvania
Pennsylvania Greenbacks
Greenback Party members of the United States House of Representatives from Pennsylvania
Burials in Pennsylvania
19th-century American politicians
Members of the United States House of Representatives from Pennsylvania